Rebel Within is the fifth solo album by American country music artist Hank Williams III. It was released on May 25, 2010. The album was Williams' last authorized album from Curb Records. The track listing was announced on Hank's website on February 25.

Track listing
All songs written by Hank Williams III except where noted.

Chart performance

References

Hank Williams III albums
2010 albums